Raushan Raj (born 12 February 1984) is an Indian cricketer who plays for Services. He made his first-class debut on 1 October 2015 in the 2015–16 Ranji Trophy.

References

External links
 

1984 births
Living people
Indian cricketers
Services cricketers
People from Chhapra